G. P. Putnam's Sons is an American book publisher based in New York City, New York. Since 1996, it has been an imprint of the Penguin Group.

History
The company began as Wiley & Putnam with the 1838 partnership between George Palmer Putnam and John Wiley, whose father had founded his own company in 1807.

In 1841, Putnam went to London where he set up a branch office, the first American company ever to do so. In 1848, he returned to New York, where he dissolved the partnership with John Wiley and established G. Putnam Broadway, publishing a variety of works including quality illustrated books. Wiley began John Wiley (later John Wiley and Sons), which is still an independent publisher to the present day.

In 1853, G. P. Putnam & Co. started Putnam’s Magazine with Charles Frederick Briggs as its editor.

On George Palmer Putnam's death in 1872, his sons George H., John and Irving inherited the business and the firm's name was changed to G. P. Putnam's Sons.  Son George H. Putnam became president of the firm, a position he held for the next fifty-two years.

In 1874, the company established its own book printing and manufacturing office, set up by John Putnam and operating initially out of newly leased premises at 182 Fifth Avenue. This printing side of the business later became a separate division called the Knickerbocker Press, and was relocated in 1889 to the Knickerbocker Press Building, built specifically for the press in New Rochelle, New York.

On the death of George H. Putnam in 1930, the various Putnam heirs voted to merge the firm with Minton, Balch & Co., who became the majority stockholders. George Palmer Putnam's grandson, George P. Putnam (1887–1950), left the firm at that time. Melville Minton, the partner and sales manager of Minton Balch & Co., became acting president and majority stockholder of the firm until his death in 1956. In 1936, Putnam acquired the publisher Coward-McCann (later Coward, McCann & Geoghegan, after John Geoghegan its long-time chairman), and ran it as an imprint into the 1980s. Upon Melville Minton's death, his son Walter J. Minton took control of the company.

In 1965, G. P. Putnam's Sons acquired Berkley Books, a mass market paperback publishing house.

MCA bought Putnam Publishing Group and Berkley Publishing Group in 1975. Phyllis E. Grann who was running Pocket Books for Simon & Schuster was brought on board in 1976 as editor-in-chief. Grann worked with MCA executive Stanley Newman on a financial model to make Putnam profitable. This model emphasized publishing key authors annually and took Putnam from $10 million in revenue to over $100 million by 1983. While keeping the list at 75 titles a year, Putnam focused on winners like Tom Clancy whose book Red Storm Rising sold nearly a million copies in 1986. Putnam along with other publishers in the 1980s moved to a heavy discount hardcover model to keep up with demand and sales through bookstore chains and price clubs. Phyllis Grann was promoted to CEO of Putnam in 1987 becoming the first woman to be CEO of a major publishing house. By 1993, the publisher was making $200 million in revenue.

In 1982, Putnam acquired the respected children's book publisher, Grosset & Dunlap from Filmways. Also in 1982, Putnam acquired the book publishing division of Playboy Enterprises, which included Seaview Books.

In the 1990s ownership of Putnam changed a number of times. MCA was bought by Matsushita Electric in 1990. Then the Seagram Company acquired 80% of MCA from Matsushita and then shortly thereafter Seagram changed the name of the company to Universal Studios, Inc. The new owners had no interest in publishing, but Phyllis Grann stepped in and was able to broker the deal for Putnam to be merged with Penguin Group in 1996, a division of British publishing conglomerate, Pearson PLC Putnam and the Penguin Group formed Penguin Putnam Inc. In 2001, Grann abruptly left after speculation over tensions with Pearson CEO Marjorie Scardino.

In 2013, Penguin merged with Bertelsmann's Random House, forming Penguin Random House.

Authors

 Ace Atkins
 A. Scott Berg
 C. J. Box
 Eleanor Brown
 Tom Clancy
 Robin Cook
 James Fenimore Cooper
 Patricia Cornwell
 Clive Cussler
 Frederick Forsyth
 Sue Grafton
 Robert A. Heinlein
 Frank Herbert
 Jack Higgins
 Washington Irving
 David Joy
 Charles Lindbergh
 Herman Melville
 Vladimir Nabokov
 Delia Owens
 Frederick Law Olmsted
 Robert B. Parker
 Francis Parkman
 Neil Pasricha
 Edgar Allan Poe
 Mario Puzo
 Theodore Roosevelt
 Christine Sadler
 John Sandford
 Renée Ahdieh

See also
 Books in the United States

References

Bibliography

External links

About Putnam at Penguin Group (USA)

Book publishing companies based in New York (state)
 01
History of New Rochelle, New York
American companies established in 1838
Publishing companies established in 1838
1838 establishments in New York (state)